Pingasa murphyi is a moth of the family Geometridae first described by Claude Herbulot in 1994. It is found in Africa.

References

Pseudoterpnini
Moths described in 1994
Taxa named by Claude Herbulot